Joerg Trippen-Hilgers is a paralympic athlete from Germany competing mainly in category F12 long jump and pentathlon events.

Joerg competed in both the long jump and pentathlon at both the 1996 Summer Paralympics and 2000 Summer Paralympics winning a bronze medal in the 2000 long jump.  At the 1996 games he also competed in the triple jump and 4 × 100 m relay, winning a silver medal with his fellow German athletes in the relay.

References

Paralympic athletes of Germany
Athletes (track and field) at the 1996 Summer Paralympics
Athletes (track and field) at the 2000 Summer Paralympics
Paralympic silver medalists for Germany
Paralympic bronze medalists for Germany
Living people
Medalists at the 1996 Summer Paralympics
Medalists at the 2000 Summer Paralympics
Year of birth missing (living people)
Paralympic medalists in athletics (track and field)
German male sprinters
German male long jumpers
German male triple jumpers
German pentathletes
Visually impaired sprinters
Visually impaired long jumpers
Visually impaired triple jumpers
Paralympic sprinters
Paralympic long jumpers
Paralympic triple jumpers